Speleophriidae is a family of copepods, comprising seven genera. All are restricted to anchialine caves, with the exception of Archimisophria, which is found in the hyperbenthos of the depths of the Atlantic Ocean. The genera are:

References

Copepods
Taxa described in 2000